WBJI (98.3 FM), known as "Babe Country 98.3", is a radio station based in Bemidji, Minnesota, (licensed to Blackduck, Minnesota, by the Federal Communications Commission) and broadcasts  contemporary country music. It is owned by RP Broadcasting.

The programming is all local except for the Bobby Bones Country Top 30, CMT After Midnight with Cody Alan, and CMT All Access with Cody Alan (all syndicated by Premiere Networks), Red Cup Country and 25 Years of Hits (syndicated by United Stations Radio Network). WBJI also previously broadcast non-local NASCAR programming.

Before "Babe Country 98.3" it was called, "Real Country 98.3" and "Good Time and Great Oldies 98", reflecting the two previous formats.

External links
Babe Country 98.3 official website
Babe Country Facebook

Country radio stations in the United States
Radio stations in Minnesota
Radio stations established in 1986
1986 establishments in Minnesota